Mohamed Rabbae (8 March 1941 – 17 May 2022) was a Moroccan-born Dutch politician and activist.

Life 
Born in Berrechid, in the French protectorate in Morocco, then controlled by Vichy France, Rabbae fled in 1966 as a student from Morocco to the Netherlands, when activists against the regime of King Hassan II were taken prisoner. In the Netherlands he finished his studies, carried out various activities and was involved in various actions for foreigners' rights, including the so-called 182 Moroccans church after asylum-seekers were threatened to be expelled by the then State Secretary of Justice  in the First Van Agt cabinet. In 1983, he was director of the Dutch Center Foreigners (NCB).
At the 1994 Dutch general election, he became an MP for the political party GreenLeft. For the elections of that year he was one of the two top candidates, along with Ina Brouwer. During the campaign, in an interview with NRC Handelsblad, Rabbae expressed understanding for people who wanted the book The Satanic Verses by Salman Rushdie banned. He said that "an attempt to have such a book banned with democratic means is better than following Khomeini and other forces of darkness". His party lost one of its six seats in those elections but gained six at the next ones, while Rabbae was still a candidate.

In 2002, Rabbae left parliament, and for some time he was an alderman in Leiden. On his first working day after a period of several months of absenteeism due to heart surgery, he resigned as an alderman. This was because of errors that had been made in his absence, but for which he took responsibility.

Rabbae was on the executive board of several organizations, especially in the field of policies on ethnic minorities. In March 2008, he was co-organizer of a large public meeting on Dam Square in Amsterdam in the framework of the International Day for the Elimination of Racial Discrimination.

On 7 April 2008, Rabbae stated in an interview that there should be an Islamic political party, "a kind of Islamic Christian Democratic Appeal". He said he would be available as an adviser for such a party. Three months later, in another interview to the same newspaper, he confirmed this declaration but precised that he himself did not intend to leave his then-present party Groenlinks, "as long as Groenlinks stays in the vicinity of my ideas".

During a political meeting in November 2010, Rabbae labelled as a fascist the far-right PVV leader Geert Wilders. In the aftermath, the Groenlinks (GL) leader Femke Halsema tweeted first that he did not speak for the party, then that he had gone too far according to her, but that she recognized his freedom of speech. After the first tweet, he sent his resignation letter to the party. The GL top was also against a judicial procedure against Wilders by several people, among whom Rabbae and a GL MP, who had subsequently been blocked from becoming a member of the party top.

Rabbae died on 17 May 2022 at the age of 81.

Publication 

References

External links 

 Parlement biography

1941 births
2022 deaths
Aldermen of Leiden
Anti-globalization activists
Dutch anti-racism activists
Dutch social justice activists
Dutch political activists
Dutch Muslims
GroenLinks politicians
Members of the House of Representatives (Netherlands)
Moroccan emigrants to the Netherlands
Minority rights activists
People from Berrechid